James Thompson McCleary (February 5, 1853 – December 17, 1924) was a United States representative from Minnesota. Born in Ingersoll, Ontario, Canada, he was educated at Ingersoll High School and McGill University (Montreal). He engaged as superintendent of the Pierce County, Wisconsin schools until 1881, when he resigned and moved to Minnesota and became State institute conductor of Minnesota and professor in the normal school in Mankato, Minnesota. He was president of the Minnesota Educational Association in 1891.

McCleary was elected as a Republican to the 53rd, 54th, 55th, 56th, 57th, 58th, and 59th congresses, holding office from March 4, 1893, to March 3, 1907.

He was defeated for reelection in 1906 to the Sixtieth congress, and was appointed Second Assistant Postmaster General during Theodore Roosevelt’s administration, holding that office from March 29, 1907, until his resignation on September 15, 1908.

He was secretary of the American Iron and Steel Institute in New York City from 1911 to 1920; he and moved to Maiden Rock, Pierce County, Wisconsin, and engaged in farming and thence to Mill Valley, California, and engaged in literary pursuits.

He returned to Maiden Rock in 1924 and that year died in La Crosse. Interment was in Lakewood Cemetery, Maiden Rock.

References

External links 
 
 

1853 births
1924 deaths
Canadian emigrants to the United States
People from Ingersoll, Ontario
McGill University alumni
American postmasters
Republican Party members of the United States House of Representatives from Minnesota
People from Maiden Rock, Wisconsin
School superintendents in Wisconsin